Slivka is a surname. Notable people with the surname include:

Rose Slivka (1919–2004), American magazine editor
Vykintas Slivka (born 1995), Lithuanian footballer

Slavic-language surnames